Elections to Liverpool City Council were held on 1 November 1927.

One third of the council seats were up for election. The term of office for each councillor being three years.

Two of the thirty-nine seats up for election were uncontested.

After the election, the composition of the council was:

Election result

Ward results

* - Councillor seeking re-election

Comparisons are made with the 1924 election results.

Abercromby

Aigburth

Allerton

Anfield

Breckfield

Brunswick

Castle Street

Childwall

Dingle

Edge Hill

Everton

Exchange

Fairfield

Fazakerley

Garston

Granby

Great George

Kensington

Kirkdale

Low Hill

Much Woolton

Netherfield

North Scotland

Old Swan

Prince's Park

Sandhills

St. Anne's

St. Domingo

St. Peter's

Sefton Park East

Sefton Park West

South Scotland

Vauxhall

Walton

Warbreck

Wavertree

Wavertree West

West Derby

By-elections

No. 16 Sefton Park West, 1 December 1927

Following the death on 17 February 1927 of Alderman Sir John Utting D.L, Councillor Frank Campbell Wilson (Liberal, Sefton Park West, elected unopposed 1 November 1926) was elected as an alderman by the councillors on 5 October 1927.

No. 18 Edge Hill, 17 September 1928

The resignation of Councillor William Smith (Labour, Edge Hill, elected 1 November 1926) was reported to the council on 5 September 1928.

See also

 Liverpool City Council
 Liverpool Town Council elections 1835 - 1879
 Liverpool City Council elections 1880–present
 1926 Liverpool City Council election#Aldermanic Election 5 October 1927
 Mayors and Lord Mayors of Liverpool 1207 to present
 History of local government in England

References

1927
1927 English local elections
November 1927 events
1920s in Liverpool